Euptoieta is a genus of butterflies in the subfamily Heliconiinae found in the Neotropical ecological zone.

Species
Listed alphabetically:
 Euptoieta bogotana (Staudinger, 1885)
 Euptoieta claudia (Cramer, 1775) – variegated fritillary
 Euptoieta hegesia (Cramer, 1779) – Mexican fritillary
 Euptoieta hortensia (Blanchard, 1852)
 Euptoieta perdistincta (Hall, 1930)
 Euptoieta poasina (Schaus, 1913)
 Euptoieta sunides (Hewitson, 1877)
 Euptoieta thekla (Hall, 1919)

References

Gerardo Lamas (edited by) (2004).  Atlas of Neotropical Lepidoptera.  Checklist: Part4A. Hesperioidea-Papilionoidea.  Scientific Publishers, Inc., Gainesville, FL.  

Argynnini
Nymphalidae genera
Taxa named by Henry Doubleday